Wills may refer to:

 Will (law), a legal document

Places

Australia
 Wills, Queensland, a locality in the Shire of Boulia
 Division of Wills, an Australian electoral division in Victoria

United States
 Wills Township, LaPorte County, Indiana
 Wills Township, Guernsey County, Ohio
 Wills, Wisconsin, an unincorporated community
 Wills Creek (Ohio), a tributary of the Muskingum River
 Wills Creek (North Branch Potomac River), in Pennsylvania and Maryland

People
 Wills (surname), a surname
 William, Prince of Wales (born 1982), nicknamed "Wills"

Other uses
 Wills baronets, of Northmoor, a former title in the Peerage of the United Kingdom - see Baron Dulverton
 Wills Hall, a student residence of the University of Bristol
 Wills Navy Cut or simply Wills, a popular cigarette brand in India

See also
 Will (disambiguation)